Loculus is a Latin word literally meaning little place and was used in a number of senses including to indicate a satchel. Satchels were carried by Roman soldiers as a part of their sarcina or luggage.

No loculus has survived in entirety although some small portions of leather found at Bar Hill (Strathclyde, Scotland) have tentatively been identified as parts of a loculus. The object is primarily known from illustrations on Trajan's Column.

It is the right size to be made in one piece from a single goat hide although calf leather is also possible. The bag is reinforced by diagonal straps. In the centre of the front of the bag these straps held a bronze ring with a mushroom-shaped stud that holds the triangular flap closed. At the top corners were two plain bronze rings used to suspend the bag while it is carried on a shoulder pole or furca.

The loculus was probably used to store rations and a soldier's personal effects.

Reconstruction
There have been many attempts to reconstruct the loculus for historical reenactment.

External links 

 Antonine Wall Fort & Camp: Bar Hill, Dunbarton, Strathclyde
 Picture of a loculus reconstruction

Ancient Roman legionary equipment
Ancient Roman military clothing